Volvarina carmelae is a species of sea snail, a marine gastropod mollusk in the family Marginellidae, the margin snails. It is endemic to the Gulf of Mexico.

Description

Distribution
Volvarina carmelae is endemic to the Gulf of Mexico, around northwestern Cuba.

References

Marginellidae
Gastropods described in 1998